Obligation of identification describes the requirement to be in possession of a valid identity card and to produce this on demand when requested by authorities.

Many countries do have an obligation of identification for their own citizens within their borders, such as many European countries.

When a person is entering or exiting a country or state, an obligation of identification is often required, e.g., passport control.

Overview 
Many countries in Europe and several states in the US do require identification:
 Europe: Overview of national ID cards in Europe
 United States: Stop and identify statutes

Identification obligation policies by country

Germany

Historical
The obligation of identification in Germany was introduced in 1938 by the Nazis for Jews and men of military age. Shortly after the start of World War II, it was extended to apply to all citizens over the age of 15. The identity card was known as Kennkarte.

British citizens were obliged to carry identity cards between October 1939 and May 1943. The British identity card did not have a photo of the individual or date of birth, just the name and address.

Present Day 
The German Act on Identity Cards and Electronic Identification (German: Personalausweisgesetz) requires all citizens over the age of 16 to be in possession of an identity card or passport and to be able to present this document to authorities on request, allowing for fines of up to 5000 € in cases of violations. Except for specific circumstances, the act however does not demand carrying such a document at all times; in cases of suspicion of a crime and/or severe doubts as to the identity, police officials may temporarily apprehend persons or accompany them to their homes to produce the document there. The German identity card has a chip which stores an image of the holder's face and may also store fingerprints for holders from the age of 6. Driver's licenses, health insurance cards and other documents issued by government-controlled authorities are not valid means of identification for German citizens.

Sweden
In Sweden there is no explicit law on obligation of identification. But still the police can demand identification in case of crime suspicion, because they have the duty to determine the identity of suspects. A person who is suspect of a crime giving a fine or an extra fee, such as no local traffic ticket, and are without an identity card, are suspect of identity fraud, a crime that can give prison and warrants an arrest. Normally those are brought to the police station and are asked for their name and personal id number and are checked against the photo stored in the passport or driver's license database. A fine is not given if the identity is given correctly. Driver's licenses are valid as identification card in Sweden. Car drivers still have mandatory duty to carry their licenses, even if there is no crime suspicion.

The situation is similar in the other Nordic countries. Identity documents from Nordic countries are valid in all these countries although some types are less known and can give problems.

See also
 
 Stop and identify statutes

References

Privacy in Germany
Identification